Jana Tucholke (born May 20, 1981 in Leipzig) is a retired female discus thrower from Germany. She set her personal best (62.31 metres) on May 12, 2007 at a meet in Leipzig.

Achievements

References

External links

1981 births
Living people
German female discus throwers
Athletes from Leipzig
Competitors at the 2003 Summer Universiade
Competitors at the 2005 Summer Universiade